Comella insularis is a moth in the  family Callidulidae. It is found on the Schouten Islands of eastern Indonesia.

References

Callidulidae
Moths described in 1916